The Kempton Park steam engines (also known as the Kempton Great Engines) are two large triple-expansion steam engines, dating from 1926–1929, at the Kempton Park Waterworks in south-west London.  They were ordered by the Metropolitan Water Board and manufactured by Worthington-Simpson in Newark-On-Trent.

Description
Each could pump  of water a day, to reservoirs at Cricklewood, Fortis Green and Finsbury Park for the supply of drinking water to the north, east & west of London. Raw water was supplied to the waterworks by the Staines and Queen Mary Reservoirs, which stored water collected from the River Thames. They were the last working survivors when they were finally retired from service in 1980.
The engines are thought to be the biggest ever built in the UK.

One of the engines, called The Sir William Prescott, has been restored to running order and is the largest fully operational triple-expansion steam engine in the world. It may be seen in steam on various weekends during the year. The engine house also houses two steam turbine water pumps. One of these steam turbines has now been motorised to demonstrate its inner workings.

The waterworks is adjacent to the A316 (just before it becomes the M3 motorway), between Sunbury-on-Thames and Hanworth.  The same site also features a 2-foot gauge steam railway, the Kempton Steam Railway, the largest steam railway offering rides to the public on selected days, in London.

The steam engines now form a museum operated by Kempton Great Engines Trust, a registered charity.

Media
 The 1971 top-ten chart hit "Tap Turns on the Water", by British band CCS, was choreographed for BBC dance troupe Pan's People and was filmed at Kempton Park. 
 The pumping station was used for the exterior shots of the Scrumptious Sweet Company factory in the 1968 film Chitty Chitty Bang Bang.
 The Second Series of the Channel 4 Show GamesMaster was filmed on Lcation at the Kempton Park Pumping Station in 1992 and 1993.
 The engines were featured in the Titanic films S.O.S. Titanic and Saving the Titanic. They were even featured in a short scene set in the Titanic's engine room in the film Holmes & Watson. The engines are very similar to the actual engines on board the Titanic albeit the Titanic's engines were 4 cylinders as opposed to three.  Yet the Kempton engines are the same size (4 stories tall) and of the same type (triple expansion). Land-based pumping engines like Kempton Park's have flywheels. Marine steam engines, like Titanic's, do not. Though it has been claimed that the engine room scenes in the Titanic film A Night to Remember were filmed at Kempton Park, they were in fact filmed at the sister pumping station at Cricklewood.
 The 2000 TV adaptation of Agatha Christie's Poirot story, The Murder of Roger Ackroyd was filmed here for the factory scenes.

See also
Metropolitan Water Board Railway
London Museum of Water & Steam
Metropolitan Water Board
Crossness Engines Trust

References

External links
Official website of Kempton Great Engines Trust
Pictures of Kempton Park Engines

Preserved stationary steam engines
Museums in Surrey
Industry museums in England
London water infrastructure
Steam museums in London
History of Middlesex
Middlesex